Tamaoki (written: 玉置) is a Japanese surname. Notable people with the surname include:

, Japanese manga artist
, Japanese judoka

Japanese-language surnames